The 1951 Belgian Grand Prix was a Formula One motor race held on 17 June 1951 at Circuit de Spa-Francorchamps. It was race 3 of 8 in the 1951 World Championship of Drivers

Report
Despite there being just 13 starters representing 3 makes of car, the race attracted a record crowd. There were a further 3 entries, including 2 Maseratis, which did not attend the event. Fangio had a new suspension with special wheels, which had to be concave to make room for the brake drums. These proved an expensive novelty. At his first pit stop, they jammed and his stop lasted over 14 minutes. Farina's Alfa Romeo dominated, holding off the Ferraris of Ascari and Villoresi. A lightning stop of 39 seconds for wheel change and refuelling preserved his lead until the finish.

Entries

Classification

Qualifying

Race

Notes
 – 1 point for fastest lap

Championship standings after the race 
Drivers' Championship standings

 Note: Only the top five positions are listed. Only the best 4 results counted towards the Championship.

References

Belgian
Belgian Grand Prix
Grand Prix, 1951
June 1951 sports events in Europe